Youth Challenge International (YCI) is a youth-centred, non-profit, non-religious, non-governmental organization focused on international development issues. It aims to equip developing country youth with skills and resources to contribute positively to their communities along with engaging Canadian youths in international development and social justice issues. Over 201 Canadian youth volunteer overseas annually with YCI.

Overview

The organization's mission is to "build the skills, experience and confidence of young people to effect positive change in their communities"(3).

YCI's operations and programming is rooted in 4 core principles:
 Youth Involvement: Youth take active decision making and leadership roles in YCI's projects
 Volunteerism: The spirit of volunteerism as central to, and a key force motivating YCI's work
 Partnership: Working with local, youth-led or youth focused organizations
 Youth Capacity Building: YCI seeks to help both youth and youth development organizations build the capacity to work autonomously as effective change agents in their respective communities

YCI operates on the belief that truly effective aid must have an explicitly youth focus – economic and social development outcomes cannot be improved without youth-specific programming. Youth represent a large share of the Global South's population structure with 1.3 billion young people aged 12 to 24 now living in developing countries. As the largest cohort of developing country youth in history, this group now makes up well over half the population of most developing countries. A critical challenge facing this population is youth unemployment, compounded by the HIV/AIDS crisis, gender inequality and disenfranchisement. Taking into account these factors, YCI's program rationale focuses on targeting these issues to promote positive youth-focused change in the developing world.

Typically, YCI operates programs in countries characterized as politically stable, less developed countries that have an existing development relationship with the northern partners of YCI such as Canada and Australia. Organizations that YCI has collaborated with include: Youth Challenge Guyana in Guyana, Reto Juvenil International in Costa Rica, Youth Challenge Australia in Vanuatu, ZANGOC and Faraja Trust in Tanzania, YMCA-Ghana in Ghana, Association for Adolescent Development and the Program for Adolescent Mothers in Grenada, and Emmanuel Development Association in Ethiopia. All of YCI's partners are fully autonomous non-profit organizations with an indigenous board of directors and local staff. An international complement of field staff joins this base to help deliver field projects in each country. YCI's long term development goal is to assure that each partner has the stability and capacity to develop a greater regional role in designing, managing and evaluating important development, health and conservation projects, along with increasing the participation of local youth and community stakeholders

In addition, YCI has built relationships with other Canadian organizations including most recently, YMCA Canada and YMCA GTA as well as Club 2/3 and Oxfam Quebec, developing collaborative programming in both Ghana and Benin.

History

Youth Challenge International was born as a charitable organization in 1989. Inspired by the UK-based Operation Raleigh (1984–1988), Canadian alumni from this project, along with new volunteers and sponsors in Canada, organized to send a group of Canadian youth to Guyana to work with Guyanese youth on community identified projects. In 1990, YCI sent 40 young Canadians, who, side by side with 40 Guyanese youth, worked on major community projects in conservation, infrastructure and health. Also, during its inaugural year, YCI partnered with the Adventure Club of the Soviet Union, sending a team of Canadian and Russian youth to the Arctic to participate in community service activities and conduct scientific research.

In 1991, a similar program to the one in Guyana was also launched in Costa Rica. The following year, the mutual successes of these programs eventually led to the establishment of autonomous organizations in both these countries. Around the same time, Australian alumni from the original Operation Raleigh, initiated Youth Challenge Australia to provide similar opportunities to Australian Youth.

In 1997, the Youth Challenge Organizations; Youth Challenge Guyana, Reto Juvenil Internacional (in Costa Rica), Youth Challenge Australia, and Youth Challenge International (based in Canada), decided to form the Youth Alliance Council. These organizations now function autonomously, financially independent from one another, but meet on a yearly basis to participate in co-operative decision making and joint planning for the member organizations.

Throughout the 1990s and 2000s, YCI has continued to increase the number of countries it operates in and has sent over 2,500 volunteers abroad, partnering with over 15 countries. It currently operates in Tanzania, Kenya, Ethiopia, Ghana, Benin, Guyana, Costa Rica, Grenada and Vanuatu. In addition, as of 2006, YCI has been working to engage Canadian youth in global development issues domestically, promoting awareness and advocacy through the functioning of its Volunteer Action Teams. In 2009, YCI launched its American partner Youth Challenge America.

Two female volunteers from New Brunswick were abducted in Ghana on June 4, 2019 and were freed in a raid by police eight days later.

Procedure

The ideal YCI volunteer candidate is aged 18–35, interested in international youth development, motivated to make positive change, seeking an international team-based experience and available for 5 to 12 weeks. Since there are programs throughout the year, volunteers have different options in terms of dates. YCI programs are structured to be team-based; youth volunteers will live and work with fellow Canadian youth or youth from their host countries.

A main component of YCI is selecting individuals to volunteer overseas on various projects. Although the process is not competitive, volunteers are selected on their own merits. Past travel, work, education, volunteer experience as well as skills and interests are taken into consideration when deciding where to place an individual. Candidates must undergo a phone interview, during which an YCI Volunteer Program staff member will help the candidate to determine which country he or she is best suited for. There is both a pre-departure learning curriculum and in-country orientation to help prepare and equip volunteers with the necessary tools and skills to complete successful placements.

External links
 Youth Challenge International
 Youth Challenge Australia
 Reto Juvenil Homepage
 YMCA – Ghana

References

Development charities based in Canada
Youth organizations established in 1989